David Lamont (born 2 April 1949) is a Scottish former footballer who played in the Football League as a midfielder for Colchester United.

Career

Born in Glasgow, Lamont joined Colchester United as an apprentice, making one Football League appearance for the club. He came on as a substitute for Tommy McKechnie in a 5–3 home defeat by Torquay United on 4 November 1967.

References

1949 births
Living people
Footballers from Glasgow
Scottish footballers
Association football midfielders
Colchester United F.C. players
English Football League players